Van Don International Airport or Ha Long Airport , is an airport in Vân Đồn District, Quảng Ninh Province, Vietnam, home to World Heritage Ha Long Bay. It is the first private airport in Vietnam, built and operated by Sun Group.

Background
According to Decision No. 1296/QD-TTg approving the Prime Minister's Plan of 19/07/2009; Decision No. 21/QD-TTg approving the Transport Ministerial Decision 2020-2030 of 08/01/2009 and Decision 576/QD-BGTVT approving the planning of an airport in Quang Ninh of 16/03/2012, Van Don airport was built with standard grade 4E, military airfield level II; acting as a domestic airport and receiver of international flights; with shared civil and military use.

According to the announcement of Prime Minister Nguyen Xuan Phuc at the meeting with the leaders of Quang Ninh province in early February 2014, the adjustment of the planning of Quang Ninh airport into an international airport was approved. The Ministry of Transport is assigned to complete the planning adjustment procedures and submit them to the Prime Minister for approval; Quang Ninh People's Committee soon accelerated investment and put Van Don International Airport into operation.

Vân Đồn is the first airport in Vietnam to be developed under a build–operate–transfer format with its payback period expected to last for 45 years. Construction on the airport commenced in 2015. The 3-phase project has an estimated total budget of 7.5 trillion VND (US$330 million). Upon completion of all three phases in 2030, the airport will be capable of handling 5 million passengers per year.

On July 11, 2018, a King Air 350 from Noi Bai International Airport landed in Van Don for a calibration flight, marking it the first flight that the airport received.

On December 30, 2018, the airport officially opened for operations, with a flight from Hanoi by Vietnam Airlines. Prime Minister Nguyễn Xuân Phúc was present on the flight and pressed the button to formally open the airport for airline operations.

Since the start of the COVID-19 pandemic in Vietnam, Van Don International Airport has been serving as a designated airport for repatriation flights of Vietnamese citizens from abroad in the North, alongside Phu Cat in the Central region and Can Tho in the South. Notable flights include from Wuhan, China, Kyiv, Ukraine, Toronto, Canada and San Francisco, United States. The flight to San Francisco is considered to be the first flight from a Vietnamese carrier to the United States. Airlines participating in the repatriation flights include Vietnam Airlines, Bamboo Airways and VietJet Air. Normal passenger flights resumed from May 4.

Facilities and infrastructure
Runway 03/21:  with a 300 m x 300 m (984.3 ft x 984.3 ft) runway safety area 
Runway 03/21 is certified for Cat II Instrument Landing operations.

Passenger Terminal
Van Don is building one passenger terminal capable of handling 2.5 million passengers and 10,000 cargo tons per year The terminal has an area of almost . It is equipped with 4 jet bridges (1 Code E and 3 Code C), 4 baggage carousels, 8 security gates and 31 check-in counters.

Airlines and destinations

Passenger

Ground transport
The  Ninh Binh-Hai Phong-Quang Ninh Expressway connects the airport to Ha Long city. It was built at a cost of over US$500 million. Operation started in December 2018.

References

External links
 Official website
 Quang Ninh International Airport on Voice of Vietnam

Airports in Vietnam
Buildings and structures in Quảng Ninh province
Airports established in 2018